Kasemeni is a sub-location locations in Kwale County, Kenya.

References

Kwale County